Hayanist is a village in the Masis Municipality of the Ararat Province of Armenia. The distance from Yerevan is 15.4 km. Despite the favourable location of the community (proximity to Yerevan and abundance of good agricultural land), most households cannot provide for their living and heads of families often chose the labour migration as the only solution of their problems. Around 160 hectares of the community's agricultural land are not irrigated.

Etymology 
The village was originally known as Gharaghshlar, Gharaghshlagh, or Kara-Kishlak, meaning black kishlak. In 1978, the village was renamed Dostlug or Dostlugh (Dostluq, meaning "friendship"); finally, it received the name Hayanist in 1991 following the exodus of its Azerbaijani population.

History 
Hayanist, then known as Kara-Kishlak, was part of the Erivan uezd of the Erivan Governorate within the Russian Empire. Bournoutian presents the statistics of the village in the early 20th century as follows:

In 1988–1989, the village's Azerbaijani population was exchanged with Armenians from Azerbaijan during the tensions of the Nagorno-Karabakh conflict.

Demographics 
The population of Hayanist since 1831 is as follows:

External links 

World Gazeteer: Armenia – World-Gazetteer.com

Notes

References

Bibliography

Further reading 
 ME&A / Clean Energy and Water Program - "Irrigation Rehabilitation in Hayanist Village", USAID

Populated places in Ararat Province
Former Azerbaijani inhabited settlements